Pamana Island (Dana, Dona, Ndana) is a small island off Rote Island in Indonesia's East Nusa Tenggara province of Lesser Sunda Islands, and the southernmost point of Asia. It lies exactly on latitude 11°S. Administratively this island is part of Rote Ndao Regency. It borders the Ashmore and Cartier Islands to the south.

The island is inhabited by some deer, various bird species and is visited annually by turtles who come to lay their eggs.

Literature

References

See also
 Extreme points of Indonesia
 Islands of Indonesia
 Lesser Sunda Islands

Landforms of East Nusa Tenggara
Rote Ndao Regency
Lesser Sunda Islands
Outer Banda Arc